General Motors TBM-3E Avenger No. 85460 is a surviving TBF Avenger torpedo bomber located at the Naval Air Station Wildwood Aviation Museum in Lower Township, Cape May County, New Jersey, United States. The plane, a variant of the Grumman-designed Avenger, was built by General Motors in 1945. Listed as TBM-3E Avenger Torpedo Bomber, it was added to the National Register of Historic Places on February 11, 2003, for its significance in military history.

See also
List of surviving Grumman TBF Avengers
National Register of Historic Places listings in Cape May County, New Jersey

References

Lower Township, New Jersey
National Register of Historic Places in Cape May County, New Jersey
World War II on the National Register of Historic Places
New Jersey Register of Historic Places
Aircraft on the National Register of Historic Places
Individual aircraft of World War II